Torah refers to the first five books of the Hebrew Bible (the Pentateuch), and the law derived from them.

Torah may also refer to:

Religion
 613 commandments in Rabbinic Judaism
 Chumash (Judaism), printed bound book form of the first five books of the Hebrew Bible
 Law of Moses, the Torah or the first five books of the Hebrew Bible
 Oral Torah
 Samaritan Torah
 Sefer Torah, handwritten copy of the Torah

People
Torah Bright, Australian snowboarder

Arts and entertainment
Torah, 1937 poem by Yonatan Ratosh

Music
Torah, album by Mordechai Ben David
Torah, album by Tommy Smith (saxophonist)
"Torah Dance", song by Eartha Kitt

See also 

 
 
 Tanak (disambiguation), the Hebrew Bible
 Pentateuch (disambiguation)
 Chumash (disambiguation)